Market overt or marché ouvert (Law French for "open market") is an English legal concept originating in mediaeval times governing subsequent ownership of stolen goods. The rule was abolished in England and Wales but it is still good law in some common law jurisdictions such as Hong Kong and British Columbia.

In general, the sale of stolen goods does not convey effective title (see Nemo dat quod non habet). However, under 'marché ouvert', if goods were openly sold in designated markets between sunrise and sunset, provenance could not be questioned and effective title of ownership was obtained. The law originated centuries ago when people did not travel much; if the victim of a theft did not bother to look in his local market on market day—the only place where the goods were likely to be—he was not being suitably diligent.

The Sale of Goods (Amendment) Act 1994, whose sole purpose was to abolish Market Overt and its equivalent in Wales, took effect in January 1995.

One designated market was Bermondsey Market in south London. A relatively recent case of stolen goods sold there was in the early 1990s when several portraits by well-known eighteenth-century portrait painters, stolen from Lincoln's Inn, each sold for less than £100 from an outside stall. Since they had been sold in 'market overt', the purchaser could keep them. To quote  Minister for the Arts Estelle Morris in July 2003 during the Second Reading of the Dealing In Cultural Objects (Offences) Bill:
I did not have information about marché ouvert in the deep recesses of my mind, but experts reliably inform me that it no longer exists. The hon. Member for Uxbridge (Mr. Randall) will be surprised to learn that it has been abolished only recently. It used to exist in designated markets, including Bermondsey. I am sure that the promoter will be interested in telling the hon. Member for Southwark, North and Bermondsey (Simon Hughes) about that. In it, items could be sold . Believe it or not, in this land of ours, people could sell stolen—my officials put "dodgy" in brackets, but we do not use that term—objects. I assure hon. Members that it has been abolished. I hope that that deals with the fears of the hon. Member for Uxbridge.

References

External links
 Speech of Lord Renton in Hansard at the second reading of the Sale Of Goods (Amendment) Bill in the House of Lords, 12 January 1994, Hansard vol. 551

Further reading
 
 
 
 
 
 
 
 
 
 
 
 
 
 
 

Retail markets in England